Dictyonella may refer to:
 Dictyonella (sponge), a genus of sponges in the family Dictyonellidae
 Dictyonella (fungus), a genus of fungi in the family Saccardiaceae
 Dictyonella, junior synonym of Eodictyonella, a genus of brachiopods in family Eichwaldiidae